Churchill Julius (15 October 1847 – 1 September 1938) was an Anglican cleric in England, then in Australia and New Zealand, becoming the first Archbishop of New Zealand.

Biography

Julius was born at Richmond, Surrey in 1847. He was educated at King's College London and Worcester College, Oxford, where he graduated BA in 1869 and MA in 1871. He was ordained a deacon in 1871 and priest in 1872.  He was Curate, firstly at St Giles' Church, Norwich (1871) and subsequently at St. Michael's, South Brent, Somerset (subsequently renamed "Brent Knoll" to avoid confusion with the village of the same name in Devonshire). Julius then became Vicar at St. Mary's, Shapwick, Somerset, a post retained until 1878 and following which he was appointed to the cure of Holy Trinity, Islington. In 1884 he left England for Australia to become Archdeacon for the diocese of Ballarat, Victoria, a post he held until 1890.

In 1889 he was nominated to the Diocese of Christchurch, New Zealand, and became the second Bishop of Christchurch in 1890. He was active in completing the Christchurch Cathedral, and in support for education, which is remembered in the Bishop Julius Hostel for women students. In 1922, he was made the first Primate and Archbishop of New Zealand. He retired in 1925.

Personal

Churchill Julius was born in Richmond Palace, Surrey, England in 1847, one of two sons born to Dr Frederic Gilder Julius (the President of the Church Association and whose father had been doctor to King William IV) and Ellen Hannah Smith. He died in Christchurch, New Zealand in 1938. He married Alice Rowlandson in 1873; they had five daughters (two of whom, Ella and Bertha, married two brothers, Arthur and Percy of the Elworthy family) and two sons; Awdry who went into the Church in New Zealand (he became Archdeacon of Timaru) and George. George (later Dr Sir George Julius) became a distinguished engineer and prolific inventor of, inter alia, the Totalisator (for racecourse betting) who spent the bulk of his life in Australia.

Julius died on 1 September 1938 and was buried at Linwood Cemetery two days later.

References

External links

 Churchill Julius in 1966 Encyclopaedia of New Zealand
 George Julius family history

1847 births
1938 deaths
Alumni of King's College London
Alumni of Worcester College, Oxford
19th-century English Anglican priests
Australian Anglican priests
English emigrants to Australia
Anglican bishops of Christchurch
Primates of New Zealand
English emigrants to New Zealand
19th-century Anglican bishops in New Zealand
20th-century Anglican bishops in New Zealand
20th-century Anglican archbishops
Burials at Linwood Cemetery, Christchurch
New Zealand Christian socialists
Anglican socialists
Churchill
Elworthy family